Michael Joseph Joyner is an American anesthesiologist and physiologist who researches exercise physiology.

Career
Michael Joyner is the Frank R. and Shari Caywood Professor of Anesthesiology at the Mayo Clinic, where his laboratory has been funded continuously by the National Institutes of Health since 1993. He was Deputy Director and Associate Dean for Research at the Mayo Clinic from 2005 to 2010. He was named a Distinguished Investigator by his colleagues at the Mayo Clinic in 2010, and he received the American Physiological Society’s Walter B. Cannon Award in 2013. A fellow of the American College of Sports Medicine (ACSM), he delivered the Joseph B. Wolffe Memorial Lecture at the ACSM's 2004 annual meeting, received the ACSM Citation Award in 2009, and delivered the opening keynote at their 2018 Conference on Integrative Physiology of Exercise. An outspoken critic of reductionism in science and medicine, he has been called "one of the world's most widely cited experts on the limits of human performance."

References

External links

Mayo Clinic Biography

Living people
American physiologists
Exercise physiologists
American anesthesiologists
University of Arizona alumni
Physicians of the Mayo Clinic
Year of birth missing (living people)